The following is a list of media available in the Irish language.

Television

Current channels

TG4 
TG4, originally known as Teilifís na Gaeilge (TnaG), broadcasts on terrestrial television in both the Republic of Ireland and Northern Ireland. It has an annual budget of €34.5 million. The station has an audience of an average of 650,000 people each day in the Republic, a fifty per cent increase on what it was in the 1990s. The station's anchor shows are the long-running soap opera Ros na Rún (160,000 weekly viewership), popular teen drama Aifric, nightly news programme Nuacht TG4 (viewership circa. 8,000), current affairs programme 7 Lá and dubbed documentaries Fíorscéal. Other popular programs include or have included a dating show, Eochair an ghrá, a documentary about the Irish language abroad, Thar Sáile, travel shows such as Amú Amigos (viewership 50,000), Seacht / Seven - a university drama set in Belfast (viewership 40,000), the dating game Paisean Faisean, South Park in Irish, chat show Ardán, talent show Nollaig No. 1, and children's shows Cúla 4 and Síle.

Cúla 4 
Cúla 4 is a digital channel and carries TG4's strand of children's programmes. Programmes are broadcast MondaysSundays from 7am to 9am, then from 2:30pm to 5:30pm. At the Tourism and Sports post-Budget briefing, Minister Catherine Martin announced Cúla 4 will have its own TV channel launched by TG4. It's scheduled for 2023.

RTÉ One

Irish public broadcaster RTÉ has one channel, RTÉ One, which broadcasts Irish-language programmes such as news bulletin Nuacht RTÉ le TG4 and new programmes every year such as documentaries of various scandals that rocked Ireland Scannal and community programme Pobal. It was reported on Tuairisc.ie in 2018 that circa. 70,000 viewers watch Nuacht RTÉ every evening on RTÉ One.

RTÉ News
RTÉ News is a digital 24-hour news service available featuring national and international news. It broadcasts news mostly in the English language but also Nuacht TG4 le RTÉ, the daily Irish language news bulletin on RTÉ ONE television and repeats Nuacht TG4 at 11:30 each night.

Houses of the Oireachtas Channel
Houses of the Oireachtas Channel or Oireachtas TV is a digital television channel in the Republic of Ireland which broadcasts live from both the Irish houses of parliament Dáil Éireann and Seanad Éireann in Dublin and also broadcasts some Oireachtas committee meetings. It covers parliamentary debates in both official national languages English and Irish although it should be known that the vast bulk of Oireachtas debates take place through English.

BBC Two Northern Ireland

The Northern Irish variant of BBC Two has its own Irish-language department producing some well-known programmes such as:
music programme for young people Imeall Geall, music programme Blas Ceoil, youth drama Teenage Cics, documentary Isteach Chun An Oileáin, cartoon Na Dódaí, interior-decor show Gaisce Gnó and community programme Féile an Phobail. It is funded by the Irish Language Broadcast Fund which has been given £12 million over a five-year period.

Radio

Radio stations entirely in Irish
There are four radio stations that broadcast entirely in Irish:

National
RTÉ Raidió na Gaeltachta (RnaG) - a national radio station which is part of the RTÉ franchise broadcasting throughout the entire island of Ireland with an annual budget of approximately €13 million similar in size to BBC Radio Cymru

Youth
Raidió Rí-Rá - Conradh na Gaeilge-run youth-orientated chart music station, currently broadcasting on the internet and in Dublin, Cork, Limerick and Galway on DAB. They hope to receive a national license to broadcast on FM.

Greater Dublin
Raidió Na Life - community and community of interest radio station broadcasting in the Greater Dublin area. The station seeks to get a national license from the Broadcasting Authority of Ireland to be able to broadcast across the Republic of Ireland on FM radio.

Greater Belfast
Raidió Fáilte - community and community of interest radio station broadcasting in the Greater Belfast area. The station seeks to get a national license from Ofcom to be able to broadcast across Northern Ireland on FM radio.

Online radio stations
Raidió Rí-Rá- Conradh na Gaeilge-run Irish language chart music internet radio station which broadcasts in some areas on DAB. Conradh na Gaeilge hope for the station to receive funding and a national license for the station to broadcast across Ireland on FM.

Stations with daily/weekly Irish-language programming
Almost all other national, regional and local stations also have at least one (usually weekly) Irish-language programme such as the following radio stations:

Outside Ireland:
3ZZZ; Melbourne Community Radio, Australia: Saturday and Sunday
WFUV; New York City Public Radio Station; Sunday morning

National:
RTÉ Radio 1 - They broadcast the news in Irish every day.
RTÉ 2fm - They have a couple of bilingual programmes.
RTÉ Pulse - The Cosmo Show (bilingual LGBT gay community and scene news)
RTÉ Junior
Newstalk Splanc programme on Friday nights

Regional / Community / Third Level:
BBC Radio Foyle - Foyle area 
Féile FM - Belfast
BBC Radio Ulster daily Gaeilge show BBC Blas (Radio Ulster) - Northern Ireland
FM104 - County Dublin
Near FM - Dublin City North-East
Wired FM - County Limerick
Connemara Community Radio - County Galway
Cork Campus Radio UCC Cork City
Flirt FM - County Galway
Liffey Sound FM - Lucan area Dublin
ICR FM - County Donegal
i102-104FM - County Mayo
Kfm - County Kildare
South East Radio - County Wexford
Midlands 103
Highland Radio - County Donegal
Galway Bay FM - County Galway
Ocean FM -County Sligo
Mid-West Radio - County Mayo
Shannonside FM - County Clare
WLR FM - County Waterford
Radio Kerry - County Kerry
Tipp FM - County Tipperary
Live 95FM - County Limerick
Clare FM - County Clare
Belfield FM - UCD Dublin
Red FM - County Cork
Phoenix 92.5FM - Dublin 15
Westport Community Radio - County Mayo
Radió Corca Baiscinn - County Clare
Dundalk FM - County Louth
Iúr FM - County Down

Top 40 Oifigiúil na hÉireann and Giotaí

A company called Digital Audio Productions specialising in all aspects of radio programming has created two very successful Top 40 Oifigiúil na hÉireann and Giotaí brands of Irish-language radio programmes. 
 
Top 40 Oifigiúil na hÉireann (Ireland's Official Top 40) is a new phenomenon, and it has become increasingly popular to hear the Irish Top 40 hits being presented entirely in Irish on what are regarded as English-language radio stations such as:

East Coast FM
Flirt FM
Galway Bay FM
LMFM
Midwest Radio
Newstalk
Red FM
SPIN 1038
Spin South West
Wired FM

Print

Newspapers

Weekly
Seachtain - weekly supplement with the Irish Independent (Wednesdays).

Newspapers with Irish-language columns
In addition to these, other newspapers which have Irish-language columns include:

 The Irish Times - weekly Irish-language page entitled Bileog published on Monday and they publish other Irish-language articles and some Irish-language news in English on their Treibh page on their website
 Irish News - Belfast-based daily newspaper for Northern Ireland; daily Irish-language pages
 Andersonstown News - based in Belfast; Irish-language columns
 Metro Éireann - Irish-language columns
 Irish Daily Star - Irish-language column (Saturdays)
 Irish Echo - Irish-language columns
 Evening Echo - weekly Irish-language segment
 The Connaught Telegraph - Irish-language columns
 The College View - Dublin City University student newspaper; Irish-language columns
 An t-Eagrán - Dublin Institute of Technology student newspaper; Irish-language segment
 An Focal - University of Limerick student newspaper; Irish-language columns
 The Nationalist (Carlow) - Weekly Irish-language segment from Glór Cheatharlach

Magazines
An Gael (print and digital) - international literary journal based in the United States
 An Gaeilgeoir
 An Lúibín - Australian fortnightly newsletter (language, culture, environment, current affairs); see Irish Language Association of Australia website
 An Músgraigheach  - 1943–1945
 An t-Eolaí - science magazine
 An Phoblacht - Sinn Féin magazine- has Irish-language page
 An tUltach - "Ulsterman" magazine- run by the Ulster branch of Conradh na Gaeilge (The Gaelic League).
 Beo - topical monthly online magazine (now available in archived form only)
 Càrn
 Celtica
 Comhar - monthly literary and current affairs magazine
 Cumasc
 Éigse
 Feasta - monthly literary and current affairs magazine
 Gaelscoil - education magazine
 Harvard Celtic Colloquium - 1981-1994
 International Congress of Celtic Studies - 1959–1995
 Iris na Gaeilge - magazine from the society Irish Cambridge
 Journal of Celtic Language Learning
 Journal of Celtic Linguistics
 Luimne - Mary Immaculate College magazine, 1999–2000
 Muintir Acla
 Nós - popular monthly youth magazine
 Oghma
 Popnuacht - pop news
 Timire
 Zeitschrift für celtische Philologie - 1987-1997
 Breac - An Chuallacht Ghaelach, UCC

Irish-language publishers
An t-Áis Aonad
Coiscéim*  
Cló Iar-Chonnacht
Leabhar Breac
Cois Life Teoranta
An Gúm
Cló Mhaigh Eo
Futa Fata
Móinín 
An tSnáithid Mhór
Cumann na Scríbheann nGaedhilge
An Clóchomhar 
Acadamh Ríoga na hÉireann
An Sagart
Ollscoil Náisiúnta na hÉireann Má Nuad
Forsai
Sáirséal - Ó Marcaigh 
Cumann Seanchas Ard Mhacha
Sliabh an Fhiolair Teoranta
Cló Chaisil  
Foilseacháin Ábhair Spioradálta (FÁS)
Glór na nGael 
Oidhreacht Chorca Dhuibhne
Púca Press
Éabhlóid
Timire

Irish language online book shops
An Ceathrú Póilí - anceathrupoili.com
Conradh na Gaeilge - cnagsiopa.com
Litríocht.ie - litriocht.ie
Siopa.ie - siopa.ie
Údar.ie - udar.ie
An Siopa Gaeilge -

Multilingual Irish publishers
Cló Mercier
Dedalus Press
O'Brien Press
Arlen House
Kilmainham Tales Teo.

Autobiographies
Ainm.ie

E-Newspapers
Tuairisc.ie (news website)

E-Magazines
NÓS.ie Young people's contemporary culture and lifestyle online magazine
RTÉ.ie Gaeilge

Online news channels
TG4 television channel
Nuacht RTÉ RTE.ie
Nuacht TG4 TG4.ie
RTÉ Raidió na Gaeltachta Nuacht Gaeltachta RTE.ie
MOLSCÉAL TG4
Meon Eile (Belfast-based news website with videos)

Social networking
Twitter in Irish
Facebook in Irish
Google in Irish
Gmail in Irish
European Union Twitter in Irish
Wordpress Gaeilge
Tearma.ie Terminology website
vBulletin version: 3.7.4 Internet forum software package

Online forums
Boards.ie (Learning Irish forum)
Boards.ie Teach na nGealt (Irish language forum in Irish)
Politics.ie (Political Irish-language forum including non-political discussion)
Daon Phoblacht Chorcaí (Cork-based Irish-language forum)
Slugger O'Toole (occasionally has articles in Irish)
Daltaí na Gaeilge (U.S.A-based Irish language organisation with online discussion forum).

Dictionaries
Ó Dónaill & De Bhaldraithe (Gaeilge > Béarla Irish to English)  
Pota Focal (ever expanding word and phrase dictionary)
Duinnín (published in 1924 and still relevant) 
Gogan  (30,000 words not published in any other Irish to English dictionary)
Tearma.ie (terminology dictionary)
Dictionary of Irish language (Old and Middle Irish to English dictionary)
Foclóir Nua (collecting and compiling ongoing)

Place name translator
Logainm.ie
  Sráidainmneacha Bhaile Átha Cliath/Dublin City Street Names

Encyclopedia
Vicipéid (Wikipedia in Irish)
Focal.ie- Gateway to electronic resources for the Irish language

Print to voice
Abair.ie

Software

Lunguashop
Com/irish
Several computer software products have the option of an Irish-language interface. Prominent examples include KDE,
Mozilla Firefox,
Mozilla Thunderbird,
OpenOffice.org, LibreOffice
and various language packs for Microsoft products including Microsoft Office.
VBulletin the most popular software for hosting online chat forums has an Irish-language option. The option of using it is available on PeoplesRepublicofCork.com.

Video games
In 2012 Derry City-based independent developer Black Market Games released 
Dead Hungry Diner, a fast-paced action-puzzler video game. An Irish-language version of Dead Hungry Diner, in conjunction with Foras na Gaeilge, was subsequently made available for free from Black Market Games' website, with the intent of promoting learning through Irish. This is credited as being the first commercial video game to be released in Irish.

Minecraft has an Irish language option in a game released in 2012 in version 1.3.1.

In 2015 the video game developer John Romero released a remake of the 1980s PC platformer, Dangerous Dave, featuring Irish as one of its languages. Romero currently resides and works in Galway. Another game on which Romero was a key developer - Commander Keen - was used in 2005 by a fan called Benvolio to make a mod entirely in the Irish language: Bunny Basher 2.

Mobile technology

In 2008 the mobile phone maker Samsung said that it would create a mobile phone specifically for the Irish-language market, which would include Irish-language predictive text. Later that year Samsung announced that all of its new phones launched from 2009 onwards would have "Gael Fón" - a feature allowing Irish as a language option, including predictive text, which was developed by the company - as standard.

Since 2012, Adaptxt, a predictive texting app for Android, also includes Irish as an available language.

Interactive iBooks

Slí Draíochta an Gha Ghreine

Irish language apps
TeachMe! Irish
 Abair leat (Irish language social networking site app)
 Ag Sparoi le Claude
 Aibítear na nAinmhithe agus na nÉan
 An Chraic
 Bábóg Baby
 Cliúsaíocht as Gaeilge
 Cúla 4
 CúlaCaint
 Cúlacaint2
 Enjoy Irish
 Get the Focal
 Greann Gaeilge
 Mo Shiopa Lidl
 Olly an Veain Bheag Bhán

Gradaim Chumarsáide an Oireachtais 

Once every year Oireachtas na Gaeilge hold Gradaim Chumarsáide an Oireachtais which are the annual Irish language awards for the Irish language media.

See also
 Irish language
 Official Languages Act 2003
 Gaeltacht
 Gaeltacht Act 2012
 Bailte Seirbhíse Gaeltachta
 Líonraí Gaeilge
 20-Year Strategy for the Irish Language 2010-2030
 Gaelscoil
 Gaelcholáiste
 Irish language in Northern Ireland
 Gaelic Revival - Irish-language revival
 Irish language outside Ireland
 Scottish Gaelic
 Gaelic broadcasting in Scotland
 List of Celtic-language media

References

External links
Top 40 Oifigiúil na hÉireann
Giotaí

Mass media in Ireland

Mass media in the Republic of Ireland
Newspapers, Republic|Irish-language media